Louise Hoffner (born 27 October 1963), known professionally as Lou, is a German pop singer. She toured with her band for 15 years, in Germany as well as abroad.

Eurovision
Lou participated in the 2001 Eurovision national finals, coming in third place. Shortly before Christmas 2002, composer Ralph Siegel asked her if she would be interested in competing in the national finals again with "Let's Get Happy", a song he had written with lyricist Bernd Meinunger.

Lou won the German 2003 finals on 7 March, which qualified her to represent Germany at the Eurovision Song Contest 2003 in Riga where she came in 11th place. In March 2006, she made a guest appearance at that year's German Eurovision preselection, singing "Let's Get Happy" in a medley of past German Eurovision entries.

Personal life
Lou was born in Waghäusel, the sixth child of her parents.

Discography

Albums
 1999 PartyGang Live (Promo Album)
 2003 For You (Jupiter Records/Sony BMG)
 2004 Ich will leben (Goodlife Records/ZYX)
 2011 Blaue Nacht
 2013 Gefühl On The Rocks

EPs
 2013 EP: Special Edition Berlin 2013

Singles
 2001 Happy Birthday Party, Sha La La La Lee
 2003 Let's get happy, Sunshine Dancing / The show must go on, Lou Tango
 2004 Dankeschoen, Ich werd dich lieben (Ich werd dich hassen), Ich will leben
 2009 Im Labyrinth der Liebe, Dein Bild in meinem Portmonnaie, Heut Nacht oder nie
 2013 Im Labyrinth der Liebe, Heut Nacht oder nie

References

1963 births
Living people
Eurovision Song Contest entrants for Germany
Eurovision Song Contest entrants of 2003
German women singers